Atelodesmis is a genus of longhorn beetles of the subfamily Lamiinae.

Species 
Atelodesmis contains the following species:

 Atelodesmis knabi (Fisher, 1925)
 Atelodesmis mannerheimii Duponchel & Chevrolat, 1841

References

Desmiphorini